Mental Funeral is the second album by Autopsy, released in 1991 by Peaceville Records.

Track listing
All music by Autopsy. Lyrics by Chris Reifert – except track 5, Eric Cutler

Personnel
Autopsy
Chris Reifert – vocals, drums
Danny Coralles – guitar
Eric Cutler – guitar, vocals on "Slaughterday"
Steve Cutler – bass

Production
Recorded November 20–26, 1990 at Different Fur, San Francisco, California, USA
Produced by Autopsy and Hammy
Engineered by Ron Rigler
Cover art by Kev Walker

References

Autopsy (band) albums
1991 albums